Serg may refer to:

Van Serg (crater), a lunar crater named for a pseudonym
Serg., taxonomic author abbreviation of Lidia Palladievna Sergievskaya (1897–1970), Soviet botanist, professor, and herbarium curator
Serg., abbreviation for Sergeant, a police and military rank
Serg Bell (born 1971), Singaporean businessman entrepreneur, investor and speaker

See also
Serge (disambiguation)